The Scey is a 20.4 km long river that traverses the Doubs and Haute-Saône departments in the Bourgogne-Franche-Comté region in eastern France. It rises in Marvelise and flows generally west to join the Ognon in Villersexel. Its tributaries include the Rognon.

References

Rivers of France
Rivers of Bourgogne-Franche-Comté
Rivers of Haute-Saône